Saint-Romain-de-Jalionas is a commune in the Isère department in southeastern France, in the Auvergne-Rhône-Alpes region.

Population

See also
 Communes of the Isère department
 Louis Etienne Ravaz (born in Saint-Romain-de-Jalionas in 1863 — Montpellier, 1937), a specialist of ampelography and one of the creators of modern viticulture

References

Communes of Isère
Isère communes articles needing translation from French Wikipedia